

Plot outline

The book tells the story of the very earliest occupation of the continent of Australia by the Negrito people, a diminutive race that arrived in Australia before the present-day aborigines' ancestors.

Critical reception

While covering a selection of possible Christmas book gifts for children in The Brisbane Telegraph in 1954, a reviewer noted: "Mr. Tindale is ethnologist at the South Australian museum, and Mr. Lindsay is the well-known authority on the Australian bushland. They have collaborated to produce an authentic and entertaining story of Australia some ten or twelve thousand years ago."

See also
 1954 in Australian literature

References

Australian children's novels
1954 Australian novels
Children's historical novels
Novels set in prehistory
CBCA Children's Book of the Year Award-winning works
1954 children's books